George Wolfman (1911-1983) was an American college baseball coach who led the California Golden Bears baseball team from 1955 through 1973, including the Bear's second national championship in the 1957 College World Series.

Playing career
Wolfman played for new Bears coach Clint Evans from 1930 through 1933, serving as team captain in 1933.  Following his college career, Wolfman played two years for the Mission Reds of the Class AA Pacific Coast League.

Coaching career
After Evans' retirement in 1954, Wolfman took over as head coach of the Bears.  He served for 19 seasons, most notably leading Cal to the 1957 College World Series championship in his only NCAA appearance.  Wolfman's teams shared three conference championships, posting 14 winning records.  Cal honored Wolfman by retiring his number 66, inducting him into the Cal Bears Hall of Fame, and naming the annual award given to the most improved baseball player for him.

Head coaching record
The following table shows Wolfman's record as a head coach.

See also

References

1911 births
1983 deaths
California Golden Bears baseball coaches
California Golden Bears baseball players
Mission Reds players